These are the international rankings of Mozambique

International rankings

References

Mozambique